Macopin is an unincorporated community located within West Milford Township in Passaic County, New Jersey, United States. The area is served as United States Postal Service ZIP Code 07480.

As of the 2000 United States Census, the population for ZIP Code Tabulation Area 07480 was 16,029.

Demographics

References

External links
 Census 2000 Fact Sheet for Zip Code Tabulation Area 07480 from the United States Census Bureau

West Milford, New Jersey
Unincorporated communities in Passaic County, New Jersey
Unincorporated communities in New Jersey